Hal Robl (1924-2003) was a linebacker in the National Football League, who played in two games for the Chicago Cardinals during the 1945 NFL season.

References

Sportspeople from Oshkosh, Wisconsin
Players of American football from Wisconsin
Chicago Cardinals players
American football linebackers
University of Wisconsin–Oshkosh alumni
1924 births
2003 deaths